Hudson's Bay Queen Street is a building complex on the southwest corner of Yonge Street and Queen Street West in downtown Toronto, Ontario, Canada. It was originally named the Simpson's Department Store, and operated as the flagship store of the Simpsons department store chain from 1895–1991. It became a flagship store of its successor, The Bay, in 1991 (rebranded to Hudson's Bay in 2013). The building was retrofitted to house the first Saks Fifth Avenue department store in Canada in 2016.

The building is the headquarters of the Hudson's Bay Company, which owns both department store chains. The company sold the building to Cadillac Fairview in 2014 and maintains a leaseback agreement with the company through at least 2039. Through this agreement, the building is part of the CF-owned Toronto Eaton Centre, although a skybridge had already connected the adjacent properties since the 1970s.

History

1895–1991: Simpsons 

The 1896 sandstone building located on Queen Street slightly west of Yonge Street was built by Toronto firm of Burke and Horwood for Simpson's Department Store in the Romanesque Revival style with Chicago School influences. The fireproof steel frame structure replaced the original 6-storey store that burned in 1895 just three-months after opening. The store was built to replace the original Simpson's dry goods business at 184 Yonge Street  and was located directly across from rival retailer's Eaton's Annex.

The store's interior featured an open atrium that extended from the ground to the sixth floor. In addition to other departments, the basement featured a coffee shop and discount division.  In 1954, it was connected to the Queen subway station and later to the PATH network.

In the early 20th Century, a Dominion supermarket (City Hall Market) occupied the northeast corner of the ground floor. It closed in the 1960s.

The store outgrew the capacity of the structure by 1900, leading to the first of several expansions. Burke and Horwood returned with additions in 1907 and 1923. The largest expansion came in 1929 with Chapman and Oxley's nine-floor Art Deco addition (facing Bay and Richmond) capped by the Arcadian Court. When construction completed, the store occupied two full city blocks.

In 1969, John B. Parkin's Simpson Tower was added to the complex at the corner of Queen Street West and Bay Street to house Simpson's offices.

Unlike Eaton's, the store survived the remaking of the neighbourhood and retained the original look. A glass-enclosed bridge was added in the late 1970s to allow customers to access the Toronto Eaton Centre without braving the elements or traffic.

Today's Special, a children's television series that aired on TVOntario and in the United States on Nickelodeon during the 1980s, utilized the location for several scenes.

1991–present: Hudson's Bay 

In 1991, the Simpson's name was replaced with the banner The Bay (amended to the current "Hudson's Bay" in 2013).

The Bay Queen Street continues the Simpson's tradition of Christmas-themed display windows facing Queen Street West west of the main Queen Street entrance.

The complex connects to the nearby Bay Adelaide Centre, Queen Station and shared underground parking complex.

In January 2014, HBC announced it had sold the property to Cadillac Fairview through a sale-and-leaseback arrangement, with HBC leasing the property for at least the following 25 years (with options for a further 50 years). Under the deal, the store is for the first time considered an official part of the Cadillac Fairview-owned Toronto Eaton Centre.

The main department store space was divided into two, with one side remodeled and opened in 2016 as a Saks Fifth Avenue, a luxury department store chain that HBC acquired in 2013, the other half retains the Hudson's Bay store.

In 2016, a grocery store, Saks Food Hall, was added run by Pusateri's in the basement.

See also 
 Toronto Eaton Centre
 Old City Hall (Toronto)
 Eaton's Annex
 Merchandise Building - originally Simpson's Mail Order Building built due to over capacity at the Queen Street store
 includes the Warehouse at 135 Dalhousie Street
 Cloud Gardens and Bay Adelaide Centre
 Hudson's Bay Montreal Downtown
 Hudson's Bay Vancouver Downtown

References

External links 

 The Bay Store Locator

Buildings and structures in Toronto
PATH (Toronto)
Chapman and Oxley buildings
Hudson's Bay Company
Chicago school architecture in Canada